Friday Night, Saturday Morning is a UK television chat show with a revolving guest host. It ran on BBC2 from 28 September 1979 to 2 April 1982, broadcast live from the Greenwood Theatre, a part of Guy's Hospital. It was notable for being the only television show to be hosted by a former British Prime Minister (Harold Wilson), and for an argument about the blasphemy claims surrounding the film Monty Python's Life of Brian (1979).

The programme was the idea of Iain Johnstone and Will Wyatt, who insisted on a changing presenter every fortnight. Another innovation was that the presenters chose the guests they were to interview.

Harold Wilson
The editions of 12 and 19 October 1979 were the first television shows ever hosted by a former or sitting British prime minister. Harold Wilson had resigned as PM three years earlier. A media-savvy personality, he seemed a promising host for a talk show, an experiment now seen as a failure. Wilson was at a loss, often leaving gaps while he tried to think of a question to ask his guests, notably Harry Secombe. When asked what Shakespearean roles she would have wished to have played, Pat Phoenix listed some, then said wistfully, "... but I'm a bit past it now." Failing to pick up on this, Wilson attempted to ask another question, at which point Phoenix exclaimed, "Say 'No'!" In 2000, Friday Night, Saturday Morning was voted in the "100 TV Moments from Hell" by Channel 4. One critic described Wilson's reading the autocue as if it were the Rosetta Stone.

Producer Iain Johnstone later attributed Wilson's poor performance to memory loss. It may have been an early sign of the Alzheimer's disease which caused Wilson's later dementia.

Monty Python's Life of Brian

On the edition of 9 November 1979, hosted by Tim Rice, a discussion was held about the then newly released film Monty Python's Life of Brian, which had been banned by many local councils and caused protests throughout the world with accusations that it was blasphemous. To argue in favour of this accusation were veteran broadcaster and noted Christian Malcolm Muggeridge, and Mervyn Stockwood (the then Bishop of Southwark). In defence of the film were two members of the Monty Python team, John Cleese and Michael Palin.

According to Monty Python - The Case Against, by Robert Hewison, the show "began affably enough, with Cleese and Palin talking on their own to their host, Tim Rice – himself the lyricist of Jesus Christ Superstar, which had also faced accusations of blasphemy a decade earlier". Hewison continues, "but while a second clip from the film was being shown, Stockwood and Muggeridge were brought on to the set. The full effect of the entry of the Bishop in his sweeping purple cassock and chunky cross was missed by the television audience, who found him already seated beside a bronzed and gleaming Malcolm Muggeridge when the film excerpt ended. Rice explained that Stockwood and Muggeridge had seen the film earlier in the day and invited their comments. With that, the gloves were off."

The debate quickly became heated and included the following exchange:

The Pythons initially seemed shocked by the aggression of the attack, especially because all four had met before the show, when there had been no hint as to what was to come.

The Bishop made the point that without Jesus this film would not exist, and ignored the Pythons' protestations that the film was about the abuse of faith, not faith itself.

In his diaries, published in 2006, Michael Palin wrote of the Bishop:

Muggeridge complained about the ease with which the Pythons "were able to extract humour from the most solemn of mysteries". He said he was upset that this film was, to him, denigrating the one man who inspired every great artist, writer, composer, etc. Cleese was keen to point out that there were other religions, and that civilisation existed before Christ. Michael Palin says of this incident in the book The Pythons, edited by Bob McCabe, that when Muggeridge said "that Christianity had been responsible for more good in the world than any other force in history", Cleese said "what about the Spanish Inquisition?"

The studio audience appeared to be on the side of the Pythons throughout, especially when Cleese said, "four hundred years ago, we would have been burnt for this film. Now, I'm suggesting that we've made an advance."

At some points, the Pythons tried to control the audience, who, they felt, were showing inappropriate partisanship in their favour.

Cleese, defending the film, went on to say that it was about "closed systems of thought, whether they are political or theological or religious or whatever: systems by which, whatever evidence is given to a person, he merely adapts it, fits it into his ideology".

As the debate went on, the Pythons found it harder to be polite. According to Palin, the Bishop was "outrageously dismissing any points we made as 'rubbish' or 'unworthy of an educated man'".

Stockwood was particularly upset at the use of the crucifixion, forgetting the distinction between it as Christian symbol and its use as a traditional Roman punishment. The debate ended with the Bishop pointing at the Pythons and saying "you'll get your thirty pieces of silver".

Cleese has frequently said that he enjoyed the debate, because, he believed, the film was "completely intellectually defensible".  However, after viewing the debate again in 2013 for BBC Radio 4's Today programme, Cleese said that it left him bored and he realised that there was no attempt at a proper discussion, and no attempt to find any common ground.

Palin told McCabe: "It turned out, after the show, that they'd missed the first fifteen minutes of the film, because they'd been having a nice lunch. John was brilliant in that show. I remember it used to be Douglas Adams's favourite bit of television ... He thought it was such a rivetting piece of TV, and it really is". Palin also claimed that, after the discussion, both his foes said "How pathetic, hopeless and meaningless and juvenile it was. Instead of there being any sort of division between us afterwards, they came up as though we'd all been 'showbiz' together, out doing an entertainment, with the Bishop saying 'That all seemed to go very well'. I hadn't realised they weren't being vindictive, they were just performing to the crowd."

Also backstage, according to Palin, he had met Raymond Johnston from the Nationwide Festival of Light, a prominent Christian group who had been campaigning to have Life of Brian banned. Instead of aggression, though, Johnston was most complimentary to Palin, saying he had been embarrassed by the performance of the Bishop. Palin says "[Johnston] had found it quite clear that Brian and Jesus were separate people", and that the film was making some "very valid points about organised religions".

Looking back, Michael Palin recalled in The Guardian: "[w]e had done our homework, thinking we were going to get into quite a tough theological argument, but it turned out to be virtually a slanging match. We were very surprised by that. I don't get angry very often, but I got incandescent with rage at their attitude and the smugness of it". Cleese preferred to sum it all up by saying "I always felt we won that one by behaving better than the Christians".

The programme and the events surrounding it were told in a Pythonesque fashion in the 2011 television film Holy Flying Circus, broadcast on BBC Four in October 2011.

After this debate, a parody of the discussion appeared on the satirical comedy show Not The Nine O'Clock News. Chaired by a host played by Pamela Stephenson (who herself would later appear as a guest on Friday Night, Saturday Morning), the parody discussion involved a bishop (played by Rowan Atkinson) defending his new film, General Synod's Life of Christ, which was accused of being "a thinly disguised and blasphemous attack on the members of Monty Python, men who are, today, still revered throughout the western world."

Episode guide
There were 64 editions broadcast over six series.

Series 1

Series 2

Series 3

Series 4

Series 5

Series 6

References

External links

BBC television talk shows
1979 British television series debuts
1982 British television series endings
1970s British television talk shows
1980s British television talk shows